Show People is a 1928 American silent comedy film directed by King Vidor. The film was a starring vehicle for actress Marion Davies and actor William Haines and included notable cameo appearances by many of the film personalities of the day, including stars Charlie Chaplin (who appears twice), Douglas Fairbanks, William S. Hart and John Gilbert, and writer Elinor Glyn. Vidor also appears in a cameo as himself, as does Davies (to a decidedly unimpressed reaction by herself in character as Peggy Pepper).

The film is a lighthearted look at Hollywood at the end of the silent film era (it was released the year after breakthrough talking picture The Jazz Singer), and is considered Davies' best role. Show People features no audible dialog but was released with a Movietone soundtrack with a synchronized musical score and sound effects. The film was re-released in the 1980s, with a new orchestral score by Carl Davis.

In 2003, Show People was selected for preservation in the United States National Film Registry by the Library of Congress as being "culturally, historically, or aesthetically significant".  It is currently available on DVD on-demand as part of the Warner Archive collection. In February 2020, the film was shown at the 70th Berlin International Film Festival, as part of a retrospective dedicated to King Vidor's career.

Plot

Young Peggy Pepper (Marion Davies) wants to be in motion pictures, so her father (Dell Henderson) drives her across the country from their home in Georgia to Hollywood. After some initial disillusionment, she meets Billy Boone (William Haines) in a studio commissary; he tells her to show up at his set if she wants work. Peggy goes, gets sprayed with seltzer water at her first entrance, and is at first shocked and dismayed to find she is doing slapstick comedy in low-budget "Comet" productions, but she decides to "take it on the chin" and, with Billy's loving support, becomes a success.

Soon enough, Peggy is signed to a contract by the prestigious "High Art" studio and, as "Patricia Pepoire", becomes a real movie star. She has fulfilled her dream of playing serious, dramatic roles, but she cuts off contact with Billy and the old comedy troupe, and soon becomes so conceited that her boring performances begin to drive away her public. On the day of her marriage to her co-star, phony-count Andre Telfair (Paul Ralli), Billy bursts in and, by means of another spritz of seltzer in her face, as well as a custard pie in Andre's, brings her to her senses, rescuing her career and their mutual happiness.

Cast 

 Marion Davies as Peggy Pepper
 William Haines as Billy Boone
 Dell Henderson as General Marmaduke Oldfish Pepper
 Paul Ralli as Andre Telfair
 Tenen Holtz as casting director
 Harry Gribbon as Jim, comedy director
 Kalla Pasha as comic chef (uncredited)
 Sidney Bracey as dramatic director
 Polly Moran as Peggy's maid
 Albert Conti as producer
 Ray Cooke as director's assistant (uncredited)
 Lillian Lawrence as comedy player at banquet (uncredited)
 Dorothy Vernon as comedy player at banquet (uncredited)
 Pat Harmon as studio Gateman (uncredited)
 Bert Roach as heavyset man in casting agency (uncredited)
 John Lowell as Director (uncredited)
 C. Aubrey Smith as Extra at Movie Preview (uncredited)
 Rolfe Sedan as portrait photographer (uncredited)
 Coy Watson as messenger boy (uncredited)
 Bess Flowers as undetermined bit role (uncredited)

Uncredited cameos:

 Renée Adorée – at banquet
 George K. Arthur– at banquet
 Eleanor Boardman – clip from Bardelys the Magnificent
 Charlie Chaplin – outside movie theater
 Lew Cody – at High Art Studios
 Karl Dane – at banquet
 Marion Davies – cameo as herself in addition to starring as Peggy
 Douglas Fairbanks – at banquet
 John Gilbert – outside film studio, in clip from Bardelys the Magnificent, at banquet
 Elinor Glyn – at High Art Studios
 William S. Hart – at banquet

 Leatrice Joy – at banquet
 Rod La Rocque – at banquet
 Robert Z. Leonard – at High Art Studios in the car scene/parking lot scene
 Mae Murray – at banquet
 Louella Parsons – at banquet
 Aileen Pringle – at banquet
 Dorothy Sebastian – at banquet
 Norma Talmadge – at banquet
 Estelle Taylor – at banquet
 King Vidor as director of war film
 Claire Windsor – at banquet

Production 
Show People offers a comic look at 1920s Hollywood and stardom. The main character of Peggy Pepper, who becomes the self-important dramatic star, Patricia Pepoire, was based on the careers of silent divas Gloria Swanson and Mae Murray. When asked, Davies supposedly told Murray the character was based on Swanson. Davies also told Swanson the character was based on Murray, but Swanson did not care since she had no inclination to see the film. As such, the film is a comic romp for Davies. Lucille Ball repeatedly cited Davies as a major comedic influence, and Ball's subsequent facial techniques and comic behaviors evident in I Love Lucy are quite apparent in Davies' performance in this film. The character of Andre Paul Ralli was seen at the time as being a satire of John Gilbert.

The film has a remarkable number of cameo appearances from some of the top stars of the day, including Charlie Chaplin, Douglas Fairbanks, William S. Hart, Norma Talmadge, Leatrice Joy, Lew Cody, Eleanor Boardman, and others. Many agreed to appear out of friendship with Davies, Hearst, and director Vidor, and the positive publicity value of cooperating with Hearst and MGM also played a factor. Both Marion Davies and King Vidor also made cameo appearances as themselves.

In one of the film's more famous sequences, the script originally called for Davies to get hit in the face with a pie after being tricked appearing in a slapstick comedy movie. William Randolph Hearst objected to this, fearing for Marion Davies' dignity, and as a compromise, the scene was changed (without Hearst's knowledge) to have Davies get hit in the face with spray from a seltzer bottle.

Vidor had wanted James Murray for the role of Billy Boone, but he was unavailable. Davies jumped at the chance to cast close friend William Haines in the role and agreed to Haines' receiving billing above the title with her. This was the only silent film in which Davies shared star billing. Once again, the reviews raved about Davies' comedic touch, and the film was a huge hit at the box office.

The closing scene on the set of a war movie may be a nod to King Vidor's The Big Parade, a smash hit made in 1925, but more closely resembles the Davies film Marianne.

See also
 List of United States comedy films
 Hollywood
 Souls for Sale
 A Trip to Paramountown

References

External links
 
 
 
 
 Show People at the silentera database
 Show People at Virtual History

1928 films
1928 comedy films
Silent American comedy films
American silent feature films
American black-and-white films
Films about actors
Films about Hollywood, Los Angeles
Films directed by King Vidor
Films produced by Irving Thalberg
Films set in Los Angeles
Films set in studio lots
Films shot in Los Angeles
United States National Film Registry films
Metro-Goldwyn-Mayer films
Transitional sound comedy films
Early sound films
1920s American films